Davide Nicola (born 5 March 1973) is an Italian professional football manager and former player. He was most recently head coach of Serie A club Salernitana.

Club career
Nicola was born in Luserna San Giovanni.

During his time in Genoa C.F.C. he was noted for kissing a policewoman on the sideline after a goal. He also helped the club to lift the 1996 Anglo-Italian Cup.

In the Serie B 2005–06 playoffs he scored a goal that gave his Torino F.C. a promotion to Serie A. In the 2006–07 season of Serie B his good play for Spezia Calcio in the last few games contributed to Spezia avoiding relegation.

He only played in the Serie A for one season in the 2004–05 season (15 games for A.C. Siena).

Managerial career
In July 2010 Nicola retired from playing for Lumezzane in order to replace the outgoing head coach Leonardo Menichini at the helm of the club. On 28 June 2011, his contract was renewed.

During the 2012–13 season, Nicola became the head coach of Livorno in Serie B. In January 2014, Livorno sacked Nicola with the club second-from-bottom in the Serie A table.

On 21 April 2014, Nicola was appointed manager of Livorno again.

On 17 November 2014, Nicola became the new manager for F.C. Bari.

On 23 June 2016, Nicola was appointed manager of Serie A newcomers Crotone. Nicola promised to ride a bicycle from Crotone to his home in Turin if they avoided relegation. Crotone finished in 17th place, two points above the relegation zone, and ahead of Empoli on the final matchday of the season in what was hailed as a football miracle, as Crotone had collected only nine points in the whole first half of the season. Fulfilling the promise, Nicola rode 1300 km from Crotone to Turin on a bicycle.

On 13 November 2018, Nicola was appointed manager of Udinese.

On 28 December 2019, Nicola was appointed manager of Genoa.

On 19 January 2021, following the sacking of Marco Giampaolo, Nicola was appointed manager of Torino. In his first game in charge, Simone Zaza scored two second-half goals to help Torino draw 2–2 with Benevento, having been two goals down. After guiding Torino to narrowly escape relegation, he was not confirmed for the new season.

On 15 February 2022, Nicola was appointed new head coach of Serie A relegation-battling club Salernitana until the end of the season. Under Nicola's tenure, Salernitana obtained 18 points in the remaining 15 matches and avoided relegation, another escape hailed as a miracle by the media. Nicola signed a new two-year contract with the club on 3 June 2022. He was later dismissed by the club on 16 January 2023, after a 8–2 loss away at Atalanta; only to be appointed back at the helm of the club just two days later. However, as results did not improve, Nicola was dismissed once again on 15 February 2023.

Personal life
Nicola was the father of Alessandro, who died in a road accident in 2014, aged 14.

Managerial statistics

References

External links

 

1973 births
Living people
Association football defenders
Italian footballers
Serie A players
Serie B players
Serie C players
Genoa C.F.C. players
S.S. Fidelis Andria 1928 players
A.C. Ancona players
Delfino Pescara 1936 players
Ternana Calcio players
A.C.N. Siena 1904 players
Torino F.C. players
Spezia Calcio players
Ravenna F.C. players
F.C. Lumezzane V.G.Z. A.S.D. players
Italian football managers
U.S. Livorno 1915 managers
F.C. Crotone managers
Udinese Calcio managers
Genoa C.F.C. managers
Torino F.C. managers
U.S. Salernitana 1919 managers
Serie A managers
People from Luserna San Giovanni
Footballers from Piedmont
Sportspeople from the Metropolitan City of Turin